The 1977 Delaware State Hornets football team represented Delaware State College—now known as Delaware State University—as a member of the Mid-Eastern Athletic Conference (MEAC) in the 1977 NCAA Division II football season. Led by third-year head coach Ed Wyche, the Hornets compiled an overall record of 7–4 and a mark of 4–2 in conference play, placing third out of seven teams in the MEAC.

The Hornets were invited to the Orange Blossom Classic, where they lost to the black national champion , 37–15.

Schedule

References

Delaware State
Delaware State Hornets football seasons
Delaware State Hornets football